The following is a list of state highways in the U.S. state of Louisiana designated in the 1-50 range prior to the 1955 Louisiana Highway renumbering. All were part of the original 98 state highways authorized by the state legislature in 1921.


Louisiana State Route 1

Louisiana State Route 1 ran  in a north–south direction from Pointe à la Hache to the Texas state line near Greenwood. The route was designated along the Jefferson Highway, an auto trail that ran from New Orleans to Winnipeg.

In 1926, US 71, US 171, and US 80 were overlaid on SR 1 from Baton Rouge to Clarence, Belmont to Shreveport, and Shreveport to the Texas state line, respectively. While the routes were signed concurrently, the state route designations were removed in the 1955 Louisiana Highway renumbering.

Louisiana State Route 2

Louisiana State Route 2 ran  in an east–west direction from the Texas state line via Lake Charles, Lafayette, Morgan City, and New Orleans to the Mississippi state line. The route was designated along the Old Spanish Trail.

In 1926, US 90 was overlaid on most of SR 2. While the route was signed concurrently, the SR 2 designation was removed in the 1955 Louisiana Highway renumbering.

Louisiana State Route 3

Louisiana State Route 3 ran  in a north–south direction from Baton Rouge to the Arkansas state line north of Lake Providence.  The designation existed in two segments as the roadway passed through the state of Mississippi between a point north of St. Francisville and Vidalia (opposite the Mississippi River from Natchez, Mississippi).  North of Vidalia, the route also passed through St. Joseph, Newellton, and Tallulah.

In 1926, the southern segment became part of US 61, and the northern segment became part of US 65 when the numbered U.S. Highway system was created.  Route 3 remained co-signed with its U.S. counterparts until the 1955 Louisiana Highway renumbering, which eliminated such overlaps.  A portion of the route north of Lake Providence bypassed in the 1930s was designated as Route 3-D while it remained in the state highway system.

Louisiana State Route 3-D

Louisiana State Route 3-D ran  in a north–south direction from US 65/SR 3 north of Lake Providence to US 65/SR 3 at Millikin. It was a portion of SR 3 bypassed in 1931.

Louisiana State Route 4

Louisiana State Route 4 ran  in a north–south direction from the Mississippi state line to LA 1 in Shreveport. The route was designated along the Dixie Overland Highway.

In 1926, US 80 was overlaid on the entirety of SR 4. While the route was signed concurrently, the SR 4 designation was removed in the 1955 Louisiana Highway renumbering.

Louisiana State Route 5

Louisiana State Route 5-D

Louisiana State Route 6

Louisiana State Route 6 ran  in an east–west direction from the Texas state line at the Sabine River to the Mississippi state line at Vidalia.

In 1934, US 84 was extended on top of the eastern half of SR 6 from the Mississippi state line to Clarence. While the route was signed concurrently, the state route designation was removed in the 1955 renumbering; the western half became the modern LA 6.

Louisiana State Route 7

Louisiana State Route 7 ran in a west–east direction from the Texas state line at the Sabine River to the Mississippi state line at Bogalusa.

In 1926, US 190 was overlaid on SR 7 from Ripley to the Mississippi state line. While the route was marked concurrently, the SR 7 designation was cancelled in favor of US 190 in the 1955 renumbering. The remainder of SR 7 became LA 12.

Louisiana State Route 8

Louisiana State Route 8 ran  in a north–south direction from US 71/SR 55 north of Shreveport to the Texas state line northwest of Rodessa.

The route became the northernmost of LA 1 in the 1955 Louisiana Highway renumbering.

Louisiana State Route 9

Louisiana State Route 10

Louisiana State Route 10 ran in a north–south direction from the Arkansas state line near Plain Dealing to Bossier City.

SR 10 became LA 3 in the 1955 renumbering.

Louisiana State Route 10-D

Louisiana State Route 11

Louisiana State Route 12

Louisiana State Route 12 ran  in a general north–south direction from Creston to Homer.

The route became the central portion of LA 9 in the 1955 renumbering.

Louisiana State Route 13

Louisiana State Route 13 ran  in an east–west direction from US 71/SR 10 at Loggy Bayou to US 80/SR 4 west of West Monroe.

The route was split among seven different routes in the 1955 Louisiana Highway renumbering.

Louisiana State Route 14

Louisiana State Route 14 ran  in a north–south direction from US 71/US 167/SR 1 in Alexandria to the Arkansas state line near Mer Rouge.

In 1926, US 165 was overlaid on the entirety of SR 14. While the route was signed concurrently, the state route designation was removed in the 1955 renumbering.

Louisiana State Route 14-D

Louisiana State Route 15

Louisiana State Route 15 ran  in a north–south direction from US 65/US 84/SR 6 in Ferriday to SR 11 in Farmersville.

SR 15 became the modern LA 15 in the 1955 renumbering.

Louisiana State Route 15-D

Louisiana State Route 15-D ran  in a south–north direction from US 65/SR 16 near Red Gum to US 65/SR 3 in Clayton.

Louisiana State Route 16

Louisiana State Route 16 ran  in a north–south direction from the Arkansas state line at Kilbourne to Winnsboro.

The route became LA 17 in the 1955 Louisiana Highway renumbering.

Louisiana State Route 17

Louisiana State Route 18

Louisiana State Route 19

Louisiana State Route 19 ran  in an east–west direction from Colfax to Harrisonburg.

The route became a portion of LA 8 in the 1955 Louisiana Highway renumbering.

Louisiana State Route 20

Louisiana State Route 20 ran  in a south–north direction from Alexandria to Shreveport.

The route became a portion of LA 1 in the 1955 Louisiana Highway renumbering.

Louisiana State Route 21

Louisiana State Route 22

Louisiana State Route 22-D

Louisiana State Route 23

Louisiana State Route 23 ran  in a north–south direction from US 167/SR 22 west of Ville Platte to a dead end at Gold Dust.

The route was split among four different routes in the 1955 Louisiana Highway renumbering.

Louisiana State Route 24

Louisiana State Route 24-D

Louisiana State Route 24-E

Louisiana State Route 25

Louisiana State Route 25-D

Louisiana State Route 26

Louisiana State Route 26 ran in a north–south direction from Kaplan to SR 1 (now US 71) near Lecompte. In 1926, US 167 was overlaid on the section from Turkey Creek north to SR 1. SR 26 was extended south to Forked Island at the Gulf Intracoastal Waterway by 1928. While the route was marked concurrently, SR 26 was deleted in favor of US 167 in the 1955 renumbering. The remainder of SR 26 became LA 13 from Turkey Creek to Kaplan and LA 35 from Kaplan to Forked Island.

Louisiana State Route 26-D

Louisiana State Route 27

Louisiana State Route 28

Louisiana State Route 29

Louisiana State Route 30

Louisiana State Route 30-D

Louisiana State Route 30-E

Louisiana State Route 30-E ran  in a north–south direction from SR 30 near Lettsworth to a second junction with SR 30 near Simmesport at the Atchafalaya River.  It was a portion of SR 30 bypassed in 1928 by a new alignment.

Louisiana State Route 30-F

Louisiana State Route 31

Louisiana State Route 32

Louisiana State Route 33

Louisiana State Route 33 ran  in a north–south direction from South Carollton Avenue in New Orleans to the Mississippi state line near Frenier. The route was part of the proposed Lakeshore Highway, but construction on the section from Kenner to Frenier was abandoned in the early 1930s mainly due to the completion of the Bonnet Carrè Spillway that split the route in half. In 1926, US 51 was overlaid on top of SR 33. While the route was marked concurrently, the state route designation was removed in the 1955 renumbering.

Louisiana State Route 34

Louisiana State Route 34 ran in a north–south direction from Slidell to the Mississippi state line at Warnerton.

In 1926, US 190 was overlaid on the portion of SR 34 from Covington to Slidell. While the route was marked concurrently, SR 34 was deleted in favor of US 190 in the 1955 renumbering. The remainder of SR 34 became LA 25.

Louisiana State Route 35

Louisiana State Route 35 ran in a west–east direction from Amite City to Franklinton.

The route became a portion of LA 16 in the 1955 renumbering.

Louisiana State Route 36

Louisiana State Route 37

Louisiana State Route 38

Louisiana State Route 39

Louisiana State Route 39 ran  in a north–south direction from US 171/SR 42 in Leesville to SR 6 at Hagewood.

The route became LA 117 in the 1955 Louisiana Highway renumbering.

Louisiana State Route 40

Louisiana State Route 41

Louisiana State Route 41 ran  in an east–west direction from SR 1 east of Melville to SR 30 in Morganza.

The route became part of LA 10 in the 1955 Louisiana Highway renumbering.

Louisiana State Route 42

Louisiana State Route 42 ran  in a north–south direction from Cameron to SR 9/US 84 at Mansfield.

In 1926, US 171 was overlaid on top of SR 42. While the route was marked concurrently, SR 42 was deleted in favor of US 171 in the 1955 renumbering.

Louisiana State Route 42-D

Louisiana State Route 42-E

Louisiana State Route 43

Louisiana State Route 43 ran in a general west–east direction from Breaux Bridge to the Gulf Intracoastal Waterway.

When SR 43 was designated in 1921, it ran from Breaux Bridge to Abbeville. In 1926, the route was extended to the Gulf Intracoastal Waterway south of Abbeville. In 1949, US 167 was overlaid on top of SR 43 from Lafayette to Abbeville. While the route was marked concurrently, SR 43 was deleted in favor of US 167 in the 1955 renumbering. The remainder of SR 43 became LA 94 from Breaux Bridge to Lafayette, LA 82 from Abbeville to Esther and LA 333 from Esther to the Intracoastal Waterway.

Louisiana State Route 44

Louisiana State Route 44 ran  in a north–south direction from US 80/SR 4 in Ruston to SR 15 southwest of Farmerville.

The route became the southern half of LA 33 in the 1955 Louisiana Highway renumbering.

Louisiana State Route 45

Louisiana State Route 46

Louisiana State Route 47

Louisiana State Route 47 ran  in a north–south direction from SR 15 north of Mangham to SR 14 south of Bastrop.

The route was split among five new routes in the 1955 Louisiana Highway renumbering.

Louisiana State Route 48

Louisiana State Route 49

Louisiana State Route 50

Louisiana State Route 50 ran  in an east–west direction from Campti to Goldonna via Creston.

The section from Campti to Creston became LA 9 and the section from Creston to Goldonna became LA 156 in the 1955 Louisiana Highway renumbering.

References